Anbe Aaruyire is a 2005 Indian Tamil-language romantic drama film directed by S. J. Surya.  The film stars S.J.Surya, debutant Nila, Urvasi, Santhana Bharathi and Santhanam. The score and soundtrack are composed by A. R. Rahman.

Plot
Siva (S. J. Surya) is an investigative scribe who shares a live-in relationship with rich and bratty Madhu (Nila). They have hot-headed run-ins and even hotter patch-ups. Things come to a head when Madhu starts a restaurant with a brother of her friend. Nosy and envious Siva cannot take it, and this causes a split between the duo. Fun starts as the fantasy element appears in the form of their apparitional alter egos. Eventually they come together, but there is plenty of over-the-top entertainment aimed at a post-teen youth audience. Anbe Aaruyire features the memories of each other in a human lookalike appearances. These memories remind them of their good times and the inner love for each other, which help in their reunion.

Cast

Production
S. J. Surya announced a film titled Isai in 2004 shortly after the release of New, when he revealed that A. R. Rahman would also collaborate for two further ventures titled Anbulla Nanbane and Aezhumazhai vs Chitra. While Isai was postponed, Anbulla Nanbane developed under the title Best Friend, before the title Anbe Aaruyire (2005) was finalised. The film was initially titled BF, an acronym of Best Friend, but Surya was met with a protest from Tamil Protection Movement led by PMK leader Ramadoss and Dalit Panthers of India leader Thol. Thirumavalavan to change the title. After three months of its launch, Surya changed the name from BF to Ah Aah, the first two letters in the Tamil alphabet. Featuring himself in the lead role again, he signed up newcomer Meera Chopra for the film and rechristened her under the stage name Nila, after initially considering the stagename of Junior Simran, owing to her likeness to Simran. He revealed that he was inspired to make the film to convey that young lovers must give each other space and wanted to showcase that attitudes towards relationships by the Indian youth was changing from the previous decade. He also called the film a "sequel to Kushi (2000)", revealing that the film's lead actors would have similar ego clashes.

Music

The soundtrack features six songs composed by A. R. Rahman and lyrics penned by Vaali. The song "Anbe Aaruyire" was initially composed in 2004 for the shelved K. S. Ravikumar-Rajinikanth venture Jaggubhai, and Surya requested Rahman if the song could be used in his film instead.

Release
Like New, the film faced hurdles prior to release with the censor boards insisting on several cuts and Surya's ongoing legal tussles meant the film was delayed. The film opened to mixed reviews in September 2005, with Sify.com labelling it as "adult entertainment" though added he "tries hard to bring his character Shiva to life but has to go miles as far as dialogue delivery and voice modulation goes but has improved leaps and bound on the dancing front". The film became his fourth consecutive commercial success in Tamil films, with Surya adamant on thanking his crew for helping get through the controversies, labelling that "team effort" helped them overcome the problems.

References

External links 

2000s Tamil-language films
2005 films
2005 romantic comedy films
Films directed by S. J. Suryah
Films scored by A. R. Rahman
Films set in Chennai
Indian romantic comedy films